Travel safe officers are uniformed employees of transport company in the UK whose presence is intended to reassure the public and deter people from engaging in anti-social behaviour. They are not police officers like the British Transport Police but may coordinate with them, nor are they Revenue Protection Inspectors who detect fare evasion. Travel safe officers are employed in London, Manchester and Scotland.

References 

Rail transport in the United Kingdom